The wild yak (Bos mutus) is a large, wild bovine native to the Himalayas. It is the ancestor of the domestic yak (Bos grunniens).

Taxonomy

The ancestor of the wild and domestic yak is thought to have diverged from Bos primigenius at a point between one and five million years ago. The wild yak is now normally treated as a separate species from the domestic yak (Bos grunniens).

Description
The wild yak is among the largest extant bovid species. The females are about one-third the weight and are about 30% smaller in their linear dimensions when compared to bull wild yaks. Domesticated yaks are somewhat smaller.

They are heavily built animals with a bulky frame, sturdy legs, and rounded cloven hooves. To protect against the cold, the udder in females and the scrotum in males are small, and covered in a layer of hair. Females have four teats. Both sexes have long shaggy hair, with a dense woolly undercoat over the chest, flanks, and thighs for insulation against the cold. In males especially, this undercoat may form a long "skirt" that can reach the ground. The tail is long and horse-like, rather than tufted like the tails of cattle or bison. The coat is typically black or dark brown, covering most of the body, with a grey muzzle (although some wild golden-brown individuals have been reported). Wild yaks with gold coloured hair are known as the wild golden yak. They are considered an endangered subspecies in China, with an estimated population of 170 left in the wild.

Two morphological types have been identified, so-called Qilian and Kunlun.

Distribution and habitat
Wild yaks once ranged up to southern Siberia to the east of Lake Baikal, but became extinct in Russia around the 17th century. Today, wild yaks are found primarily in northern Tibet and western Qinghai, with some populations extending into the southernmost parts of Xinjiang, and into Ladakh in India. Small, isolated populations of wild yak are also found farther afield, primarily in western Tibet and eastern Qinghai. In historic times, wild yaks were also found in Bhutan, but they are now considered extinct there.

They are most commonly found in alpine tundra with a relatively thick carpet of grasses and sedges rather than the more barren steppe country.

The wild yak was thought to be regionally extinct in Nepal in the 1970s, but was rediscovered in Humla in 2014. This discovery later made the species to be painted on Nepal's currency.

Behaviour and ecology

The diet of wild yaks consists largely of grasses and sedges, such as Carex, Stipa, and Kobresia. They also eat a smaller amount of herbs, winterfat shrubs, and mosses, and have even been reported to eat lichen. Historically, the main natural predator of the wild yak has been the Himalayan wolf, but Himalayan black bears, Himalayan brown bears and snow leopards have also been reported as predators in some areas, likely of young or infirm wild yaks.

Thubten Jigme Norbu, the elder brother of the 14th Dalai Lama, reported on his journey from Kumbum in Amdo to Lhasa in 1950:

Wild yaks are herd animals. Herds can contain several hundred individuals, although many are much smaller. Herds consist primarily of females and their young, with a smaller number of adult males. On average female yaks graze 100m higher than males. Females with young tend to choose grazing ground on high, steep slopes. The remaining males are either solitary, or found in much smaller groups, averaging around six individuals. Groups move into lower altitude ranges during the winter. Although wild yaks can become aggressive when defending young, or during the rut, they generally avoid humans, and may flee for great distances if approached.

Reproduction

Wild yaks mate in summer and give birth to a single calf the following spring. Females typically only give birth every other year.

Conservation
The wild yak is currently listed as Vulnerable on the IUCN Red List. It was previously classified as Endangered, but was downlisted in 1996 based on the estimated rate of population decline and current population sizes. The latest assessment in 2008 suggested a total population of no more than 10,000 mature individuals.

The wild yak is experiencing threats applied by several sources. Poaching, including commercial poaching, has remained the most serious threat; males are particularly impacted because of their more solitary habits. Disturbance by and interbreeding with livestock herds is also common. This may include the transmission of cattle-borne diseases, although no direct evidence of this has yet been found. Conflicts with herders themselves, as in preventive and retaliatory killings for abduction of domestic yaks by wild herds, also occur but appear to be relatively rare. Recent protection from poaching particularly appears to have stabilized or even increased population sizes in several areas, leading to the IUCN downlisting in 2008. In both China and India, the species is officially protected; in China it is present in a number of large nature reserves.

Impact on humans 
The wild yak is a reservoir for zoonotic diseases of both bacterial and viral origins. Such bacterial diseases include anthrax, botulism, tetanus, and tuberculosis.

References

External links

ARKive – images and movies of the wild yak (Bos grunniens)
AnimalInfo.Org: Animal Info – Wild Yak

Mammals described in 1883
Mammals of Nepal
Mammals of India
Mammals of China
Bovines
Extant Zanclean first appearances
Yaks
Taxa named by Nikolay Przhevalsky